Livin' Sacrifice was one of the earliest all girl punk bands in Sweden. The band started in a basement in Spånga in 1978. They soon got a reputation for being a good live band and was quickly signed to Rosa Honung. Their latest gig was in 1995.

Selected discography 
 San, EP, 1981
 Levande offer, LP, 1982
 Fuck off, SP, 1982
 Vägra för helvete, compilation LP, 1983
 Motorhead Tribute, compilation CD, 1995
 Kiss covered in Scandinavia, compilation CD, 1996
 1, mini-CD, 1997
 Svenska punkklassiker 78-81, compilation CD, 2003

References

External links 
 http://www.myspace.com/livinsacrificesweden

Swedish punk rock groups